EA Phenomic was a real-time strategy video game developer, headquartered in Ingelheim, Germany, and founded as Phenomic Game Development in 1997 by Volker Wertich, who had previous worked in Blue Byte and developed The Settlers and The Settlers III.  The studio was acquired by Electronic Arts on August 23, 2006 and renamed as EA Phenomic.

Electronic Arts announced that EA Phenomic would concentrate on developing real-time strategy video games.

In July 2013, EA closed the studio and laid off the 60 employees.

Games developed

References

External links

German companies established in 1997
German companies disestablished in 2013
Electronic Arts
Video game companies established in 1997
Video game companies disestablished in 2013
Defunct video game companies of Germany